The 1969–70 New York Knicks season was the 24th season of NBA basketball in New York City. The Knicks had a then single-season NBA record 18 straight victories en route to 60–22 record, which was the best regular season record in the team's history. They set the record for the best start in the first 24 games of a season at 23–1 before the Golden State Warriors surpassed it in 2015. After defeating the Bullets in the Eastern Division semifinals and the Milwaukee Bucks in the Eastern Division finals, the Knicks defeated the Los Angeles Lakers in seven games to capture their first NBA title.

The 1969–70 Knicks are considered to be among New York City's finest sporting championship teams, and are considered the greatest team in Knicks history and among the best in NBA history. Their journey was chronicled in various books and films, most recently in When the Garden was Eden for ESPN's 30 for 30 series.

NBA Draft

Roster

Pre season

Game log

|-

All times are EASTERN time

Regular season

Standings

x – clinched playoff spot

Record vs. opponents

Game log

|- align="center" bgcolor="#ccffcc"
| 1 || October 14, 1969 || || Seattle || 126–101 || Madison Square Garden || || 1–0
|- align="center" bgcolor="#ccffcc"
| 2 || October 15, 1969 || || @ Cincinnati || 94–89 || Cincinnati Gardens || || 2–0
|- align="center" bgcolor="#ccffcc"
| 3 || October 17, 1969 || || @ Chicago || 116–87 || Chicago Stadium || || 3–0
|- align="center" bgcolor="#ccffcc"
| 4 || October 18, 1969 || || Los Angeles || 99–96 || Madison Square Garden || || 4–0
|- align="center" bgcolor="#ccffcc"
| 5 || October 21, 1969 || || Phoenix || 140–116 || Madison Square Garden || || 5–0
|- align="center" bgcolor="#ffcccc"
| 6 || October 23, 1969 || || San Francisco || 109–112 || Madison Square Garden || || 5–1
|- align="center" bgcolor="#ccffcc"
| 7 || October 24, 1969 || || @ Detroit || 116–92 || Cobo Center || || 6–1
|- align="center" bgcolor="#ccffcc"
| 8 || October 25, 1969 || || Baltimore || 128–99 || Madison Square Garden || || 7–1
|- align="center" bgcolor="#ccffcc"
| 9 || October 28, 1969 || || Atlanta || 128–104 || Madison Square Garden || || 8–1
|- align="center" bgcolor="#ccffcc"
| 10 || October 30, 1969 || || San Diego || 123–110 || Madison Square Garden || || 9–1
|-

|- align="center" bgcolor="#ccffcc"
| 11 || November 1, 1969 || || Milwaukee || 112–108 || Madison Square Garden || || 10–1
|- align="center" bgcolor="#ccffcc"
| 12 || November 3, 1969 || || @ Milwaukee || 109–93 || MECCA Arena || || 11–1
|- align="center" bgcolor="#ccffcc"
| 13 || November 4, 1969 || || @ Phoenix || 116–99 || Arizona Veterans Memorial Coliseum || || 12–1
|- align="center" bgcolor="#ccffcc"
| 14 || November 7, 1969 || || @ San Diego || 129–111 || San Diego Sports Arena || || 13–1
|- align="center" bgcolor="#ccffcc"
| 15 || November 9, 1969 || || @ Los Angeles || 112–102 || The Forum || || 14–1
|- align="center" bgcolor="#ccffcc"
| 16 || November 11, 1969 || || @ San Francisco || 116–103 || Cow Palace || || 15–1
|- align="center" bgcolor="#ccffcc"
| 17 || November 13, 1969 || || Chicago || 114–99 || Madison Square Garden || || 16–1
|- align="center" bgcolor="#ccffcc"
| 18 || November 15, 1969 || || Boston || 113–98 || Madison Square Garden || || 17–1
|- align="center" bgcolor="#ccffcc"
| 19 || November 18, 1969 || || Cincinnati || 112–94 || Madison Square Garden || || 18–1
|- align="center" bgcolor="#ccffcc"
| 20 || November 21, 1969 || || @ Philadelphia || 98–94 || The Spectrum || || 19–1
|- align="center" bgcolor="#ccffcc"
| 21 || November 22, 1969 || || Phoenix || 128–114 || Madison Square Garden || || 20–1
|- align="center" bgcolor="#ccffcc"
| 22 || November 25, 1969 || || Los Angeles || 103–96 || Madison Square Garden || || 21–1
|- align="center" bgcolor="#ccffcc"
| 23 || November 26, 1969 || || @ Atlanta || 138–108 || Alexander Memorial Coliseum || || 22–1
|- align="center" bgcolor="#ccffcc"
| 24 || November 28, 1969 || || vs. Cincinnati(at Cleveland, OH) || 106–105 || Cleveland Arena || || 23–1
|- align="center" bgcolor="#ffcccc"
| 25 || November 29, 1969 || || Detroit || 98–110 || Madison Square Garden || || 23–2
|-

|- align="center" bgcolor="#ccffcc"
| 26 || December 2, 1969 || || Seattle || 129–109 || Madison Square Garden || || 24–2
|- align="center" bgcolor="#ccffcc"
| 27 || December 5, 1969 || || @ Baltimore || 116–107 || Baltimore Civic Center || || 25–2
|- align="center" bgcolor="#ccffcc"
| 28 || December 6, 1969 || || Milwaukee || 124–99 || Madison Square Garden || || 26–2
|- align="center" bgcolor="#ffcccc"
| 29 || December 9, 1969 || || Cincinnati || 101–103 || Madison Square Garden || || 26–3
|- align="center" bgcolor="#ccffcc"
| 30 || December 10, 1969 || || @ Milwaukee || 96–95 || MECCA Arena || || 26–3
|- align="center" bgcolor="#ffcccc"
| 31 || December 11, 1969 || || @ Seattle || 105–112 || Seattle Center Coliseum || || 27–4
|- align="center" bgcolor="#ffcccc"
| 32 || December 13, 1969 || || Philadelphia || 93–100 || Madison Square Garden || || 27–5
|- align="center" bgcolor="#ffcccc"
| 33 || December 16, 1969 || || Atlanta || 124–125 (OT) || Madison Square Garden || || 27–6
|- align="center" bgcolor="#ccffcc"
| 34 || December 19, 1969 || || @ Chicago || 108–99 || Chicago Stadium || || 28–6
|- align="center" bgcolor="#ccffcc"
| 35 || December 20, 1969 || || Baltimore || 128–91 || Madison Square Garden || || 29–6
|- align="center" bgcolor="#ccffcc"
| 36 || December 25, 1969 || || Detroit || 112–111 || Madison Square Garden || || 30–6
|- align="center" bgcolor="#ffcccc"
| 37 || December 26, 1969 || || @ Los Angeles || 106–114 || The Forum || || 30–7
|- align="center" bgcolor="#ccffcc"
| 38 || December 27, 1969 || || vs. Seattle(at Vancouver, BC) || 119–117 || Pacific Coliseum || || 31–7
|- align="center" bgcolor="#ccffcc"
| 39 || December 28, 1969 || || @ Phoenix || 135–116 || Arizona Veterans Memorial Coliseum || || 32–7
|- align="center" bgcolor="#ccffcc"
| 40 || December 30, 1969 || || Chicago || 116–96 || Madison Square Garden || || 33–7
|-

|- align="center" bgcolor="#ffcccc"
| 41 || January 2, 1970 || || @ Milwaukee || 105–118 || MECCA Arena || || 33–8
|- align="center" bgcolor="#ffcccc"
| 42 || January 3, 1970 || || Boston || 104–111 || Madison Square Garden || || 33–9
|- align="center" bgcolor="#ccffcc"
| 43 || January 6, 1970 || || @ Baltimore || 129–99 || Baltimore Civic Center || || 34–9
|- align="center" bgcolor="#ccffcc"
| 44 || January 7, 1970 || || @ San Francisco || 99–94 || Cow Palace || || 35–9
|- align="center" bgcolor="#ccffcc"
| 45 || January 9, 1970 || || @ San Francisco || 123–93 || Cow Palace || || 36–9
|- align="center" bgcolor="#ffcccc"
| 46 || January 10, 1970 || || @ San Diego || 115–123 || San Diego Sports Arena || || 36–10
|- align="center" bgcolor="#ccffcc"
| 47 || January 12, 1970 || || vs. Phoenix(at Salt Lake City, UT) || 130–114 || Salt Palace Acord Arena || || 37–10
|- align="center" bgcolor="#ccffcc"
| 48 || January 16, 1970 || || @ Detroit || 104–102 || Cobo Center || || 38–10
|- align="center" bgcolor="#ffcccc"
| 49 || January 18, 1970 || || @ Boston || 102–109 || Boston Garden || || 38–11
|- align="center" bgcolor="#ccffcc"
| 50 || January 23, 1970 || || @ Chicago || 120–117 || Chicago Stadium || || 39–11
|- align="center" bgcolor="#ccffcc"
| 51 || January 24, 1970 || || San Diego || 127–114 || Madison Square Garden || || 40–11
|- align="center" bgcolor="#ccffcc"
| 52 || January 25, 1970 || || @ Boston || 102–96 || Boston Garden || || 41–11
|- align="center" bgcolor="#ccffcc"
| 53 || January 27, 1970 || || Boston || 133–100 || Madison Square Garden || || 41–11
|- align="center" bgcolor="#ccffcc"
| 54 || January 29, 1970 || || Detroit || 127–106 || Madison Square Garden || || 43–11
|- align="center" bgcolor="#ccffcc"
| 55 || January 30, 1970 || || @ Philadelphia || 104–100 || The Spectrum || || 44–11
|- align="center" bgcolor="#ccffcc"
| 56 || January 31, 1970 || || Chicago || 123–104 || Madison Square Garden || || 45–11
|-

|- align="center" bgcolor="#ccffcc"
| 57 || February 1, 1970 || || @ Detroit || 117–111 || Cobo Center || || 46–11
|- align="center" bgcolor="#ccffcc"
| 58 || February 3, 1970 || || San Francisco || 118–98 || Madison Square Garden || || 47–11
|- align="center" bgcolor="#ffcccc"
| 59 || February 4, 1970 || || @ Atlanta || 96–111 || Alexander Memorial Coliseum || || 47–12
|- align="center" bgcolor="#ccffcc"
| 60 || February 6, 1970 || || @ Cincinnati || 135–92 || Cincinnati Gardens || || 48–12
|- align="center" bgcolor="#ccffcc"
| 61 || February 7, 1970 || || Cincinnati || 121–114 || Madison Square Garden || || 49–12
|- align="center" bgcolor="#ffcccc"
| 62 || February 11, 1970 || || Boston || 118–125 (OT) || Madison Square Garden || || 49–13
|- align="center" bgcolor="#ccffcc"
| 63 || February 13, 1970 || || @ Philadelphia || 151–106 || The Spectrum || || 50–13
|- align="center" bgcolor="#ccffcc"
| 64 || February 14, 1970 || || Philadelphia || 116–114 || Madison Square Garden || || 51–13
|- align="center" bgcolor="#ccffcc"
| 65 || February 17, 1970 || || Los Angeles || 114–93 || Madison Square Garden || || 52–13
|- align="center" bgcolor="#ffcccc"
| 66 || February 21, 1970 || || Atlanta || 106–122 || Madison Square Garden || || 52–14
|- align="center" bgcolor="#ffcccc"
| 67 || February 22, 1970 || || @ Baltimore || 104–110 || Baltimore Civic Center || || 52–15
|- align="center" bgcolor="#ccffcc"
| 68 || February 24, 1970 || || Phoenix || 121–105 || Madison Square Garden || || 53–15
|- align="center" bgcolor="#ccffcc"
| 69 || February 28, 1970 || || Baltimore || 115–101 || Madison Square Garden || || 54–15
|-

|- align="center" bgcolor="#ccffcc"
| 70 || March 3, 1970 || || San Francisco || 115–100 || Madison Square Garden || || 55–15
|- align="center" bgcolor="#ccffcc"
| 71 || March 6, 1970 || || San Diego || 107–103 || Madison Square Garden || || 56–15
|- align="center" bgcolor="#ccffcc"
| 72 || March 7, 1970 || || @ Philadelphia || 111–104 || The Spectrum || || 57–15
|- align="center" bgcolor="#ffcccc"
| 73 || March 8, 1970 || || Philadelphia || 116–133 || Madison Square Garden || || 57–16
|- align="center" bgcolor="#ccffcc"
| 74 || March 10, 1970 || || Seattle || 117–99 || Madison Square Garden || || 58–16
|- align="center" bgcolor="#ffcccc"
| 75 || March 13, 1970 || || vs. Seattle(at Portland, OR) || 103–115 || Memorial Coliseum || || 58–17
|- align="center" bgcolor="#ccffcc"
| 76 || March 14, 1970 || || @ San Diego || 119–103 || San Diego Sports Arena || || 59–17
|- align="center" bgcolor="#ffcccc"
| 77 || March 15, 1970 || || @ Los Angeles || 101–106 || The Forum || || 59–18
|- align="center" bgcolor="#ccffcc"
| 78 || March 17, 1970 || || @ Detroit || 122–106 || Cobo Center || || 60–18
|- align="center" bgcolor="#ffcccc"
| 79 || March 18, 1970 || || Milwaukee || 108–116 || Madison Square Garden || || 60–19
|- align="center" bgcolor="#ffcccc"
| 80 || March 20, 1970 || || @ Atlanta || 102–110 || Alexander Memorial Coliseum || || 60–20
|- align="center" bgcolor="#ffcccc"
| 81 || March 21, 1970 || || Cincinnati || 120–136 || Madison Square Garden || || 60–21
|- align="center" bgcolor="#ffcccc"
| 82 || March 22, 1970 || || @ Boston || 112–115 || Boston Garden || || 60–22
|-

|-
| 1969–70 Schedule

All times are EASTERN time

Playoffs

|- align="center" bgcolor="#ccffcc"
| 1
| March 26
| Baltimore
| W 120–117
| Willis Reed (30)
| Dave DeBusschere (24)
| Walt Frazier (8)
| Madison Square Garden19,500
| 1–0
|- align="center" bgcolor="#ccffcc"
| 2
| March 27
| @ Baltimore
| W 106–99
| Willis Reed (27)
| Willis Reed (17)
| Frazier, Barnett (6)
| Baltimore Civic Center12,289
| 2–0
|- align="center" bgcolor="#ffcccc"
| 3
| March 29
| Baltimore
| L 113–127
| Walt Frazier (24)
| Dave DeBusschere (10)
| Walt Frazier (5)
| Madison Square Garden19,500
| 2–1
|- align="center" bgcolor="#ffcccc"
| 4
| March 31
| @ Baltimore
| L 92–102
| Walt Frazier (25)
| Willis Reed (15)
| Walt Frazier (7)
| Baltimore Civic Center12,289
| 2–2
|- align="center" bgcolor="#ccffcc"
| 5
| April 2
| Baltimore
| W 101–80
| Willis Reed (36)
| Willis Reed (36)
| Walt Frazier (6)
| Madison Square Garden19,500
| 3–2
|- align="center" bgcolor="#ffcccc"
| 6
| April 5
| @ Baltimore
| L 87–96
| Walt Frazier (18)
| Willis Reed (16)
| Walt Frazier (5)
| Baltimore Civic Center12,289
| 3–3
|- align="center" bgcolor="#ccffcc"
| 7
| April 6
| Baltimore
| W 127–114
| DeBusschere, Barnett (28)
| Willis Reed (14)
| Walt Frazier (8)
| Madison Square Garden19,500
| 4–3
|-

|- align="center" bgcolor="#ccffcc"
| 1
| April 11
| Milwaukee
| W 110–102
| Willis Reed (24)
| Dave DeBusschere (10)
| Bill Bradley (6)
| Madison Square Garden19,500
| 1–0
|- align="center" bgcolor="#ccffcc"
| 2
| April 13
| Milwaukee
| W 112–111
| Willis Reed (36)
| Willis Reed (19)
| Walt Frazier (14)
| Madison Square Garden19,500
| 2–0
|- align="center" bgcolor="#ffcccc"
| 3
| April 17
| @ Milwaukee
| L 96–101
| Willis Reed (21)
| Reed, DeBusschere (10)
| Walt Frazier (7)
| Milwaukee Arena10,746
| 2–1
|- align="center" bgcolor="#ccffcc"
| 4
| April 19
| @ Milwaukee
| W 117–105
| Willis Reed (26)
| Walt Frazier (11)
| Dick Barnett (8)
| Milwaukee Arena10,746
| 3–1
|- align="center" bgcolor="#ccffcc"
| 5
| April 20
| Milwaukee
| W 132–96
| Willis Reed (32)
| Dave DeBusschere (11)
| Walt Frazier (6)
| Madison Square Garden19,500
| 4–1
|-

|- align="center" bgcolor="#ccffcc"
| 1
| April 24
| Los Angeles
| W 124–112
| Willis Reed (37)
| Reed, DeBusschere (16)
| Dick Barnett (9)
| Madison Square Garden19,500
| 1–0
|- align="center" bgcolor="#ffcccc"
| 2
| April 27
| Los Angeles
| L 103–105
| Willis Reed (29)
| Willis Reed (15)
| Walt Frazier (11)
| Madison Square Garden19,500
| 1–1
|- align="center" bgcolor="#ccffcc"
| 3
| April 29
| @ Los Angeles
| W 111–108 (OT)
| Willis Reed (38)
| Willis Reed (17)
| Walt Frazier (7)
| The Forum17,500
| 2–1
|- align="center" bgcolor="#ffcccc"
| 4
| May 1
| @ Los Angeles
| L 115–121 (OT)
| Dick Barnett (29)
| Dave Stallworth (13)
| Walt Frazier (11)
| The Forum17,509
| 2–2
|- align="center" bgcolor="#ccffcc"
| 5
| May 4
| Los Angeles
| W 107–100
| Walt Frazier (21)
| Cazzie Russell (8)
| Walt Frazier (12)
| Madison Square Garden19,500
| 3–2
|- align="center" bgcolor="#ffcccc"
| 6
| May 6
| @ Los Angeles
| L 113–135
| Dave DeBusschere (25)
| Dave DeBusschere (9)
| Dick Barnett (8)
| The Forum17,509
| 3–3
|- align="center" bgcolor="#ccffcc"
| 7
| May 8
| Los Angeles
| W 113–99
| Walt Frazier (36)
| Dave DeBusschere (7)
| Walt Frazier (19)
| Madison Square Garden19,500
| 4–3
|-

Player statistics

Season

|- align="center"
|  || 82 || || 33.8 || 6.0 || || 2.8 || 2.7 || 3.6 || || || 14.9
|- align="center"
|  || 81 || || 9.2 || 1.2 || || 0.5 || 3.2 || 0.6 || || || 2.9
|- align="center"
|  || 67 || || 31.3 || 6.2 || || 2.2 || 10.0 || 2.5 || || || 14.5
|- align="center"
|  || 79 || || 33.3 || 6.2 || || 2.2 || 10.0 || 2.5 || || || 14.6
|- align="center"
|  || 77 || || 39.5 || 7.8 || || 5.3 || 6.0 || 8.2 || || || 20.9
|- align="center"
|  || 36 || || 6.5 || 1.3 || || 0.7 || 1.8 || 0.5 || || || 3.3
|- align="center"
|  || 37 || || 6.5 || 1.1 || || 0.5 || 1.4 || 0.5 || || || 2.6
|- align="center"
|  || 81 || || 38.1 || 8.7 || || 4.3 || 13.9 || 2.0 || || || 21.7 
|- align="center"
|  || 81 || || 20.7 || 3.1 || || 1.4 || 2.4 || 2.5 || || || 7.7
|- align="center"
|  || 78 || || 20.0 || 4.9 || || 1.6 || 3.0 || 1.7 || || || 11.5
|- align="center"
|  || 82 || || 16.8 || 2.9 || || 2.0 || 3.9 || 1.7 || || || 7.8
|- align="center"
|  || 44 || || 6.2 || 1.0 || || 0.5 || 0.9 || 0.7 || || || 2.5
|- align="center"
|  || 82 || || 240.6 || 46.4 || || 22.2 || 48.9 || 26.0 || || || 115.0
|}

Opponents

vs. Atlanta

vs. Baltimore

vs. Boston

vs. Chicago

vs. Cincinnati

vs. Detroit

vs. Los Angeles

vs. Milwaukee

vs. Philadelphia

vs. Phoenix

vs. San Diego

vs. San Francisco

vs. Seattle

Total

|- align="center"
|  || 82 || || 240.6 || 40.3 || || 25.1 || || || || || 105.9
|}

Playoffs

|- align="center"
|  || 19 || || 37.6 || 6.9 || || 3.1 || 2.1 || 3.4 || || || 16.9
|- align="center"
|  || 18 || || 7.1 || 1.0 || || 0.4 || 2.4 || 0.3 || || || 2.4
|- align="center"
|  || 19 || || 32.4 || 5.3 || || 1.8 || 3.8 || 3.2 || || || 12.4
|- align="center"
|  || 19 || || 36.9 || 6.8 || || 2.4 || 11.6 || 2.4 || || || 16.1
|- align="center"
|  || 19 || || 43.9 || 6.2 || || 3.6 || 7.8 || 8.2 || || || 16.0
|- align="center"
|  || 5 || || 5.8 || 0.8 || || 0.6 || 1.0 || 0.4 || || || 2.2
|- align="center"
|  || 10 || || 3.5 || 1.0 || || 0.0 || 0.0 || 0.0 || || || 2.0
|- align="center"
|  || 18 || || 40.7 || 9.9 || || 3.9 || 13.8 || 2.8 || || || 23.7 
|- align="center"
|  || 19 || || 15.6 || 2.8 || || 1.3 || 2.4 || 1.4 || || || 6.9
|- align="center"
|  || 19 || || 16.1 || 4.2 || || 0.9 || 2.5 || 0.8 || || || 9.4
|- align="center"
|  || 19 || || 14.5 || 3.2 || || 0.8 || 4.1 || 1.1 || || || 7.2
|- align="center"
|  || 2 || || 2.2 || 0.2 || || 0.0 || 0.3 || 0.2 || || || 0.4
|- align="center"
|  || 19 || || 256.3 || 48.3 || || 18.8 || 51.8 || 24.2 || || || 115.6
|}

Opponents

1970 NBA Eastern Division Semifinals: vs. Baltimore

1970 NBA Eastern Division Finals: vs. Milwaukee

1970 NBA Finals vs. Los Angeles

Total

|- align="center"
|  || 19 || || 48.5 || 41.9 || || 23.1 || || || || || 106.8
|}

Media

Local TV

Some New York Knicks TV Games never aired on WOR-TV because of broadcast conflict with the New York Rangers (NHL).

Local Cable TV

National TV

Local Radio

Some New York Knicks radio games never aired on WHN because of broadcast conflict with the New York Rangers (NHL).

National Radio

Public Address Announcer

Transactions
Transactions listed are from July 1, 1969 to June 30, 1970.

1970 NBA Expansion Draft

Trades

Awards and records

20th NBA All-Star Game

New York Knicks NBA All-Star representatives at the 1970 NBA All-Star Game in Philadelphia, Pennsylvania at The Spectrum.

NBA finals

Without question, the defining moment in the series occurred in Game 7, where an injured Reed limped onto the court right before the start of the game.

On a re-creation of that moment, Marv Albert described it: "Here comes Willis! The crowd is going wild! Willis passes the scorers table, he grabs a basketball. The Lakers have stopped (shooting), the Lakers are watching Willis!"

He scored the game's first two baskets and proceeded not to score for the remainder of the game.  Contrary to popular lore, he did not sit out after his first two baskets, but remained on the floor for 27 minutes.  Despite his lack of scoring after his first four points, Reed's heroics inspired the team, and they won the game by a score of 113–99.  The entire starting line up for the 69–70 Knicks had their jerseys retired by the New York Knicks.  The jerseys of Walt Frazier (#10), Willis Reed (#19), Dave DeBusschere (#22), Bill Bradley (#24), and Dick Barnett (#12) all hang from the rafters at Madison Square Garden. Reed walking on to the court was voted the greatest moment in Madison Square Garden history.

Knicks win series 4–3

References
 Knicks on Database Basketball
 Knicks on Basketball Reference

New York
New York Knicks seasons
NBA championship seasons
New York Knicks
New York Knicks
1960s in Manhattan
1970s in Manhattan
Madison Square Garden